"Madrina" is a song by Maes released in 2018. The song peaked at number-one on the French Singles Chart and featured vocals from French rapper Booba.

Charts

References

2018 singles
2018 songs
French-language songs
Number-one singles in France